Muhammad's views on Christians were shaped through his interactions with them. Muhammad had a generally semi-positive view of Christians and viewed them as fellow receivers of Abrahamic revelation (People of the Book). However, he also criticised them for some of their beliefs. He sent various letters to Christian world leaders inviting them to "Submission to God, Islam". According to Islamic tradition, he interacted with Christians while in Mecca.

Book of Peace 
The Ashtiname (Book of Peace) of Muhammad is a document which is a charter or writ ratified by Muhammad granting protection and other privileges to the followers of Jesus, given to the Christian monks of Saint Catherine's Monastery. It is sealed with an imprint representing Muhammad's hand. According to the monks' tradition, Muhammad frequented the monastery and had great relationships and discussions with the Sinai fathers.

An abridged version of the ashtiname is as follows:

Before the First Revelations
At the age of nine, or according to some sources twelve, Muhammad went to Syria with his uncle Abu Talib and had interactions with Christians. One important contact was with the Nestorian monk Bahira in Bosra, modern Syria who foretold to the adolescent Muhammad his future prophetic career. This narrative is found in multiple accounts of Syrian literature.

Another narrative found in the Sira of Ibn Sa'd shows that while Muhammad was working for Khadija, she had him go on a journey to Syria along with a man named Maysarah. Once they reached Bostra in the south of Syria, Muhammad was reported to have taken shelter underneath a tree. A monk named Nestor approached Maysarah asking him who was the man underneath the tree. Explaining to the monk who he was, Nestor quickly responded, "None other than a Prophet is sitting beneath that tree."

Waraqah ibn Nawfal was a Nestorian monk, first cousin to Muhammad's wife Khadija, and Mecca's priest or preacher according to some sources. He was the first man to tell Muhammad that he was a prophet based on the first revelation he received in the cave of Hira.

Byzantines
According to traditional Islamic sources, in 628 Muhammad sent a letter to Heraclius inviting him to Islam. The text of the letter to Heraclius, reads as follows:Islamic sources say that after the letter was read to him, he was impressed by it and he gifted the messenger of the epistle with robes and coinage. Alternatively, he also put it on his lap. Later reportedly he wrote to a certain religious official in Rome to confirm if Muhammad's claim of prophethood was legitimate, and, after receiving the reply to his letter, called the Roman assembly saying, "If you desire salvation and the orthodox way so that your empire remain firmly established, then follow this prophet," to the rejection of the council. Heraclius eventually decided against conversion but the envoy was returned to Medina with the felicitations of the emperor. Some historians disagree with this account, arguing that there is no evidence outside of Islamic sources suggesting that Heraclius had any knowledge of Islam.

In 629 according to tradition, Muhammad sent a force of 3,000 men to fight 100,000 Byzantines near Al Karak. The Battle of Mu'tah ended with a defeat of Muhammad's army. Subsequent sources present the battle as a Muslim victory given that most of the Muslim soldiers returned safely.

Ethiopians 

According to the traditional view, members of the early Muslim community in Mecca faced persecution, which prompted Muhammad to advise them to seek refuge in Aksum. The earliest account is given by the 8th-century historian Ibn Ishaq:When the Quraysh learned that Muhammad's companions could safely practice their religion in the Aksumite kingdom, they decided to send a delegation to the Negus to demand the surrender of the fugitives. The delegation included Amr ibn Hishām. The Meccans appealed to the generals, arguing that the Muslim migrants were "foolish youths" who had invented a new religion, the likes of which neither the Meccans nor the Aksumites had heard of, and that their relatives were asking for their return. Najashi, the king, granted them an audience and asked if they had with them anything which had come from God. One of the Muslims, Jafar, then recited a passage from the Quran's Surah Maryam. When the king heard it, he exclaimed: "Verily, this and what Jesus brought (the Gospel) has come from the same source of light". He then affirmed that he would never give up the Muslims.

Muhammad later wrote a letter to the Christian king an-Najjāshī (Armah) who saved the Muslims:There are no secular sources that indicate his response to the letter, but Muslim sources assume he became a Muslim since sources indicate that the Islamic prophet Muhammad prayed an absentee funeral prayer in Madinah which is performed upon a dead Muslim if they die in a place with no Muslims to pray for the dead. Such prayer is only performed for dead Muslims.

The Christians of Najran Interaction with Muhammad during the Medina Period
The city of ancient-Najran, which is called Ukhdud today, is located just outside present-day Najran approximately 1200 miles south of Medina.  Ancient-Najran was a Christian city located at the intersection of two main caravan routes.  The city was also in a particular geographical place which allowed it to boom with agriculture and industry making it an ideal center of trade.  One can infer that this played a significant role in Muhammad's interest in the city.  Due to this interest, the Christian identity became vulnerable to Islam first in the Meccan period with the increase of the Qu’ran availability throughout the Arabian Peninsula. However, it was not until the Medina Period that the first interactions between the Christians of Najran and Muhammad took place.

It was during Muhammad's time in Medina that he began inviting different groups to Islam.  He sent two envoys specifically to Najran; one of them being the Islamic leader Khalid ibn al-Walid who would protect the people's ability to practice Christianity under Islamic government.

So in response, Najran sent a delegation of Christian scholars with the interest of investigating the Prophet's revelations.  Their group was met with hospitality and security from the Prophet.  The delegation and Muhammad met for two or three days, according to some sources, debating peacefully about their religions.  The debates ended in an understanding that each religion would leave the other alone.

The terms of the Covenant between Muhammad and the Najrans were:

In the name of God, the Merciful, the Beneficent. This is what Muhammad, the Prophet and God’s Messenger, has written down for the people of Najran when he has the authority over all their fruits, gold, silver, crops and slaves. He has benevolently left them all that in return for 2,000 hullas every year, 1,000 to be given in the month of Rajab and 1,000 in the month of Safar. Each hulla is equal to one ounce [a measure equal to 4 dirhams]. The Najran are also required to provide accommodation and expenses for my messengers, for up to 20 days. None of my messengers shall be kept in Najran more than one month. They are also required to give, as a loan, 30 shields, 30 horses and 30 camels, in case of any disorder and treachery in Yemen. If anything is lost of the shields, horses or camels they loan to my messenger, it will remain owing by my messenger until it is given back. Najran has the protection of God and the pledges of Muhammad, the Prophet, to protect their lives, faith, land, property, those who are absent and those who are present, and their clan and allies. They need not change anything of their past customs. No right of theirs or their religion shall be altered. No bishop, monk or church guard shall be removed from his position. Whatever they have is theirs, no matter how big or small. They are not held in suspicion and they shall suffer no vengeance killing. They are not required to be mobilized and no army shall trespass on their land. If any of them requests that any right of his should be given to him, justice shall be administered among them. He who takes usury on past loans is not under my protection. No person in Najran is answerable for an injustice committed by another. 

This covenant remained intact after the death of Muhammad until the second caliph, Umar, expelled the Christians of Najran due to violations of the peace.  He sent them to Iraq where they were to be taken as refugees and provided settlement.

See also

 Ashtiname of Muhammad
Christianity and Islam

Notes

References
Al-Jibouri, Yasin T. Khadija Daughter of Khuwaylid, (accessed January 8, 2007)
 Siddiqui, Muzammil. Prophet Muhammad as a Political Leader (accessed January 8, 2007)

Christianity
Muhammad